H. J. Mulliner & Co. was a well-known British coachbuilder operating from Bedford Park, Chiswick, West London. The company which owned it was formed by H J Mulliner in 1897 but the business was a continuing branch of a family business founded in Northampton in the 1760s to hire out carriages.  In December 1909 the controlling interest in this company passed to John Croall & Sons of Edinburgh. Croall sold that interest to Rolls-Royce in 1959.

"Mulliner" is now the personal commissioning department for Bentley.

Henry Jervis Mulliner

Henry Jervis Mulliner (1870–1967), born in Liverpool but raised in Chiswick, was the second son of Robert Bouverie Mulliner (1830–1902) from Northampton, third son of Francis Mulliner (1789–1841) of Leamington Spa and Northampton. Robert Bouverie Mulliner had first established a thriving coachbuilding business in Liverpool in the mid-1850s then sold that to his brother and in the early 1870s started another in Chiswick on the outskirts of London.

His son H. J. Mulliner incorporated his own company in 1897 while with Mulliner London Limited. He found a special interest in the automobile side of that business and expanded in 1900 by buying from Mulliner London Limited the Mulliner showroom in Brook Street, Mayfair, London. The location was more convenient for his clients than Chiswick. One of the early clients was C.S. Rolls who had a body built on a Rolls-Royce Silver Ghost for his own use.

John Croall & Sons Edinburgh

In 1906 the London works were moved from Mayfair to Chiswick and in December 1909 H J Mulliner sold a controlling interest in the company to John Croall & Sons of Edinburgh. A family connection was maintained as Croall employed H J Mulliner's wife's brother, Frank Piesse (1885–1960), to run the company.

Although bodies were fitted to other chassis, by the 1930s virtually the entire output was being fitted to Rolls-Royce and Bentleys.

Rolls-Royce

Rolls-Royce acquired Mulliner in July 1959 and merged it with Park Ward which they had owned since 1939 forming Mulliner Park Ward in 1961. A financial columnist noted that the (cash) outlay for Rolls-Royce was relatively small as the net assets of John Croall were around £250,000. It was noted that Mulliner was one of the last independent coach builders, others being controlled by motor manufacturers or distributors.

See also

 Mulliner Park Ward
 Park Ward
 Mulliners (Birmingham)
 Arthur Mulliner

Notes

References

External links

 Design for a coupé de ville on a Bentley 4¼ litre chassis
 The former multi-storey works in Flanders Road behind the Norman Shaw showroom is now an office building known as Mulliner House

Mulliner
Vehicle manufacture in London